Skeletocutis microcarpa is a species of poroid fungus in the family Polyporaceae that is found in Venezuela. It was reported as a new species by mycologists Leif Ryvarden and Teresa Iturriaga. The type collection was made in January 1997, in Yutajé (Amazonas State), where it was found growing on the bark of a living tree. The fruit bodies of this fungus are in the form of small brown caps measuring up to 8 mm wide and long by 4 mm thick. Its spores are smooth, ellipsoid, hyaline, and measure 3–3.3 by 2 μm.

References

Fungi described in 2003
Fungi of Venezuela
microcarpa